Herschel Smith (January 25, 1900 – January 3, 1964) was an American wrestler. He competed in the freestyle middleweight event at the 1924 Summer Olympics.

References

1900 births
1964 deaths
Olympic wrestlers of the United States
Wrestlers at the 1924 Summer Olympics
American male sport wrestlers
Sportspeople from Chicago